The 2009 Radivoj Korać Cup is the 7th season of the Serbian men's national basketball cup tournament. The Žućko's Left Trophy was awarded to the winner Partizan Igokea from Belgrade.

Venue

Qualified teams

1 League table position after 13 rounds played

Bracket

Quarterfinals

Semifinals

Final

See also 
 2008–09 Basketball League of Serbia
 Milan Ciga Vasojević Cup

References

External links 
 History of Radivoj Korać Cup

Radivoj Korać Cup
Radivoj
Serbia